George Hare may refer to:
 George Emlen Hare (1808–1892), American Protestant Episcopal clergyman
 George Hare Philipson (1836–1918), English physician
 Saint George Hare (1857–1933), an Irish painter